Muzaffarpur Junction railway station, station code MFP, is an A1 category railway station in the Sonpur division of East Central Railway. Muzaffarpur Junction is selected in station re-development plan with airport facilities & will be by Railway Infrastructure Development authority. Muzaffarpur Junction is located in Muzaffarpur city, the headquarters of Muzaffarpur district in the Indian state of Bihar.

Background
In February 2012, the Indian Railways had planned to set up a railway station Development Corporation (RSDC) that would work on improving the major railway stations, including Muzaffarpur Junction, by building and improving passenger amenities.
Under the development scheme, major development works are going on Muzaffarpur Junction. Separate air conditioned waiting lounge, free WiFi facility, IRCTC food court and many facilities are going to be available on Muzaffarpur Junction at the end of 2018. To enhance the security of this station, a metal detector and baggage handling system will be installed soon.

Passenger movement
Muzaffarpur is amongst the top hundred booking stations of the Indian Railway.

Platforms
There are eight platforms in Muzaffarpur Junction. The station ranks 46th out of 75 A1 category stations of Indian Railways included in the Cleanness Survey conducted by IRCTC in 2017.

The platforms are interconnected with three foot overbridges. Platforms no.6,7 and 8 are mainly for Hajipur, Sitamarhi, Narkatiaganj and Raxaul-bound passenger trains and some low-priority trains in the direction. Platforms no. 1, 2, 3,4 and 5 cater to most of the trains passing through the junction; platforms no. 1, 2, 3, 4 and 5 are the most important.

Trains 
Sonpur is the divisional headquarters, and all the trains passing through this route have stoppages here. Several electrified local passenger trains and express trains run from Muzaffarpur to neighbouring destinations. The following is a list of all the trains passing from Muzaffarpur Junction (as of 10 May 2012). The Muzaffarpur Junction is well connected to most of the major cities in India by the railway network and serves the city with numerous trains such as Sapt Kranti Express, Garib Rath Express etc. ISO 9001:2008 certified train Vaishali Express crosses the station daily in both directions and ISO 9001:2008 certified train Dibrugarh–New Delhi Rajdhani Express crosses the junction. Champaran Humsafar Express from Katihar to Delhi is running twice a week from 10 April 2018.

References

External links 

 Muzaffarpur Junction map

Railway stations in Muzaffarpur district
Railway junction stations in Bihar
Sonpur railway division
Railway stations in India opened in 1886
Buildings and structures in Muzaffarpur
Transport in Muzaffarpur